The 2012 W-League season was the 18th season of the league's existence, and 9th season of second division women's soccer in the United States. The regular season started on May 11 and ended on July 15.

Changes from 2011 season

Name changes 
One team changed their name in the off-season:

Expansion teams 
Three teams were added for the season:

Teams leaving 
No teams either folded or left following the 2011 season:

Standings
As of 7/15/2012 
Orange indicates Host Team for W-League Championship
Purple indicates division title clinched
Green indicates playoff berth clinched

Eastern Conference

Atlantic Division

Northeast Division

Southeast Division

Central Conference

Central Division

Western Conference

Western Division

Playoffs

 Note: Ottawa Fury hosts the W-League Championship and gains an automatic berth in the National Semi-Finals.

Eastern Conference Playoffs

Central Conference Playoffs

Western Conference Playoff

W-League Championship

Semi-finals

Third Place Playoff

Championship

Awards

 Most Valuable Player: Grace Hawkins, (LIR)
 Rookie of the Year: Lynn Williams, (PAB)
 Defender of the Year: Cindy Walsh, (LAV)
 Coach of the Year: Charlie Naimo, (PAB)
 Goalkeeper of the Year: Anna Maria Picarelli, (PAB)

All-League and All-Conference Teams

Eastern Conference
F: Kristin Burton (ATL), Grace Hawkins (LIR)*, Mikaela Howell (DCU)
M: Yael Averbuch (NJW)*, Ashley Clarke (NJV), Hayley Siegel (DCU)
D: Marisa Abegg (DCU), Vaila Barsley (LIR)*,  Sabbath McKiernan-Allen (CHR), Tabitha Padgett (CSC)
G: Robyn Jones (CHR)

Central Conference
F: Nkem Ezurike (LAV), Kinley McNicoll (TOR), Imen Trodi (QUE)*
M: Catherine Charron-Delage (LAV), Katrina Gorry (OTT), Lisa-Marie Woods (OTT)
D: Alyscha Mottershead (TOR), Haillie Price (HAM),  Cindy Walsh (LAV)*, Kathryn Williamson (OTT)
G: Jasmine Phillips (OTT)

Western Conference
F: Edite Fernandes (SCL), Jenna Richardson (VAN), Lynn Williams (PAB)*
M: Brittany Bock (COL), Sarah Huffman (PAB)*, Verónica Pérez (SEA)*
D: Sasha Andrews (PAB)*, Stephanie Cox (SEA)*,  Michelle Pao (PAB), Brooke Spence (COR)
G: Anna Maria Picarelli (PAB)*

* denotes All-League player

References

2
USL W-League (1995–2015) seasons
W